Brent Griffiths (born 24 March 1990) is an Australian footballer who plays as a defender for Gwelup Croatia.

Early life
Griffiths was born in Stoke-on-Trent, England and raised in the northern suburbs of Perth, Western Australia. He attended Mater Dei College in Edgewater, Western Australia

Club career

Perth Glory
In May 2009, Griffiths was signed to a professional contract by Perth Glory after playing a season in the national youth league.

Stirling Lions
After Leaving the Glory, Griffiths joined local Perth team Stirling Lions. While at the club Griffiths went on trial with A-League teams Adelaide United and Central Coast Mariners.

Wellington Phoenix
Griffiths crossed the ditch to trial with the Wellington Phoenix.
On 30 September 2011, Griffiths was signed by A-League club Wellington Phoenix on a 1 year contract after a successful trial.

Central Coast Mariners
On 30 July 2012 it was announced he had signed a one year deal to play for Central Coast Mariners in the A-League. Griffiths has since won the A-league with Central Coast Mariners in the 2012–13 season whilst also qualifying for the round 16 of the Asian champions league.

Penang
After Griffiths was released by the Mariners at the end of the 2014–15 season, he signed with Malaysian Super League side Penang FA.

On 9 July 2016, Griffiths and Penang mutually terminated his contract.

Bayswater City
In March 2017, Griffiths joined NPL Western Australia side Bayswater City on a two-year contract.
And as of 25 May, has garnered the most red cards for a single player in the club's history.

Gwelup Croatia
In December 2020, Brent signed with Gwelup Croatia for the 2021 season.

Balcatta Etna FC
In June 2022, Brent signed with Balcatta Etna FC for the remainder of the 2022 NPL Season, assisting them in fighting relegation and remaining in top flight football in Western Australia.

Personal life
His elder brother, Rostyn Griffiths previously played for Eredivisie team Roda JC. The brothers were together, during their stints in the youth set up of English Premier League side, Blackburn Rovers.

A-League career statistics 
(Correct as of 6 February 2012)

References

External links
 Perth Glory profile
Wellington Phoenix profile

1990 births
Living people
Australian soccer players
Perth Glory FC players
A-League Men players
Wellington Phoenix FC players
Central Coast Mariners FC players
Penang F.C. players
Expatriate footballers in Malaysia
Australian expatriate sportspeople in Malaysia
Association football defenders
Stirling Macedonia FC players